Sleeping Giant was an American Christian metal band from Redlands, California and Salt Lake City, Utah. All the members of the band, minus drummer Matt Weir, played in the band xDEATHSTARx.

History
Sleeping Giant was founded in 2006 by several members of xDeathstarx. The group released its first album, Dread Champions of the Last Days, in 2007 on Facedown. Sleeping Giant's release, Finished People, was issued on Century Media in 2014. On December 1, 2017, the band announced they returned to Facedown Records to release their final album, I Am. The band announced they would play their final show on February 17, 2018. They also released their debut single from the album, "No Love".

Members

Final lineup
 Tom Green – vocals (2006–2018)
 Geoff Brouillette – guitar (2006–2018), bass (2006–2009, 2013–2018)
 Eric Gregson – guitar (2009–2013, 2018)
 Andrew P. Glover – guitar (2018)
 J.R. Bermuda – bass (2009–2013, 2018)
 Matt Weir – drums (2010–2018)

Former
 Travis Boyd – drums (2006–2010)
 Cory Johnson – guitar (2006–2008)
 Manny Contreras – guitar (2008–2009)
 Nelson Flores – guitar (2014–2018)

Session musicians
 Tom Brady – bass (2006–2009)

Live musicians
 Lazarus Rios – bass (2016)

Timeline

Discography

Studio albums

Singles
"No Love" (December 1, 2017; Facedown)

References

External links
 Cross Rhythms Interview
 Indie Vision Music Interview
 HM Magazine Concert Review
 Jesus Freak Hideout Concert Review
 Cross Rhythms Article

American Christian metal musical groups
Metalcore musical groups from Utah
Metalcore musical groups from California
Century Media Records artists
Facedown Records artists
Heavy metal musical groups from California
Heavy metal musical groups from Utah
Musical groups from Salt Lake City
Musical groups established in 2006
Musical groups disestablished in 2018
2006 establishments in the United States